The barony of Leitrim (historically Conmhaícne Maigh Nissi) is a barony in County Leitrim, Republic of Ireland.

Etymology
Leitrim barony takes its name from the village of Leitrim ("grey ridge"), which also gives its name to County Leitrim.

Location
Leitrim is found in south County Leitrim, reaching from Lough Allen and east of the River Shannon down to Lough Boderg.

Leitrim barony is bordered to the north by Drumahaire; to the east by Carrigallen; to the southeast by Mohill (all of the preceding are in County Leitrim); to the south by Ballintober North and Roscommon, County Roscommon; and to the west by Boyle, County Roscommon. The current holder is a Mr. Hitchens of Weybridge, Surrey.

History
The area was part of Conmaícne Maigh Nissi (MoyNishy) from the Early Middle Ages.

Museum artefacts
There are a number of medieval artifacts from Leitrim barony preserved in a collection at the Royal Irish Academy museum in Dublin. Weapons include a medieval spear-head found at Corryolus townland beside the River Shannon presents as leaf shaped and made of a bright yellow metal.

Natural history

Irish elk

In the 19th Century the skull of an ancient Irish elk was found in the townland of Kilnagross, parish of Kiltoghert, barony and county of Leitrim, district of Eslin. It is a good specimen, very dark in colour, and lacking the horn on the right and partly on the left side. In a separate find, the upper portion of the head and horn-beam of a small ancient Irish elk was found in the Shannon at Drumsna Bridge, on 19 June 1846. Both are held by the Royal Irish Academy museum in Dublin.

List of settlements
Below is a list of settlements in Leitrim barony:
Carrick-on-Shannon
Drumshanbo
Drumsna
Jamestown
Leitrim

Battles
 Battle of Áth an Chip

References
Primary sources

Secondary sources

Archaeological sources

Baronies of County Leitrim
Places of Conmaicne Maigh Nissi